Albert M. Clark (March 4, 1879 – June 9, 1950) was a justice of the Supreme Court of Missouri from 1939 to 1950.

Born in Lawson, Ray County, Missouri, Clark graduated from Vanderbilt University in 1900. He served in the Missouri House of Representatives and the Missouri Senate prior to his election to a ten-year term on the state supreme court in 1938. He was reelected in 1948, but died while serving in Jefferson City, Missouri, two years into his second term, at the age of 78.

References

1879 births
1950 deaths
People from Ray County, Missouri
Vanderbilt University alumni
Members of the Missouri House of Representatives
Missouri state senators
Judges of the Supreme Court of Missouri